FACES syndrome is a syndrome of unique facial features, anorexia, cachexia, eye and skin anomalies.

It is a rare disease and estimated to occur in less than 1 in 1 million people.

References

External links 

Syndromes affecting the eye
Musculoskeletal disorders
Rare syndromes
Syndromes affecting the skin
Syndromes with craniofacial abnormalities